"4 More" is the third and final single released by De La Soul from their fourth album, Stakes Is High. The song deals with relationships, and features R&B duo Zhané. It was produced by De La Soul and DJ O.Gee from D.I.T.C.. Rolling Stone included "4 More" in its list of the group's best fifteen songs.

Track listing
"4 More (Clean Version)" - 4:19
Guest Appearances: Zhane
"Supa Emcees (Clean Version)" - 3:47
"Sweet Dreams (Clean Version)" - 3:27
"Itzsoweezee (HOT) (De La Soul Remix)" - 4:37
Guest Appearances: Yankee B

Charts

References 

1997 singles
De La Soul songs
1996 songs
Tommy Boy Records singles
American hip hop songs
Songs written by David Jude Jolicoeur
Songs written by Vincent Mason
Songs written by Kelvin Mercer
Zhané songs